Terry Ray may refer to:

 Terry Ray (gridiron football) (born 1969), retired American and Canadian football defensive back and linebacker
 Terry Ray (actor) (born 1961), American actor, screenwriter, and producer
 Terry Ray (boxer) (born 1963), American former professional boxer who competed from 1986 to 2001
 Terry Ray  (1915–2003), American film actress, better known as Ellen Drew